Shatoi Reserve is the largest reserve in Chechnya. The reserve lies between the Chanti-Argun and Sharo-Argun Rivers. The dominant vegetation consists of valuable trees, and berry bushes, nut trees, herbal plants (medicinal and melliferous) and also mushrooms.

References

Protected areas of Russia
Geography of Chechnya